The National Lottery is the state-licensed lottery of the Republic of Ireland. Established in 1986 to raise funds for good causes, it began operations on 27 March 1987 when it issued its first scratchcards. It launched the weekly drawing game Lotto the following year, holding the first draw on 16 April 1988. The National Lottery now offers Lotto and Lotto Plus draws on Wednesdays and Saturdays, EuroMillions and Plus draws on Tuesdays and Fridays, and two Daily Million draws each day. Its other games include televised bingo, Millionaire Raffles, and online instant-win games. The minimum age to play all National Lottery games is 18.

Almost 40 percent of Irish adults play National Lottery games regularly, with nearly 30 percent of sales going toward good causes in the areas of sport and recreation, national culture and heritage, the arts, community health, youth welfare and amenities, and the natural environment. In 2021, total National Lottery sales were €1.05 billion, with a total of €586 million returned in prizes and €304 million distributed to good causes. It was the first year that sales had exceeded €1 billion. Since its inception, the National Lottery has raised a cumulative total of over €6 billion for good causes.

From 1986 to 2014, the state-owned An Post National Lottery Company operated the National Lottery. To raise funds during a financial crisis, the Irish government sold the National Lottery licence for 20 years to a private operator, Premier Lotteries Ireland DAC, which took over the National Lottery in November 2014. At that time, the Minister for Public Expenditure and Reform appointed an independent regulator of the National Lottery (currently Carol Boate) to oversee operations.

Administration
In 1986, the Irish government initiated a public tender process, inviting bids for a licence to run the National Lottery. Among the bidders were the operators of the Irish Hospitals' Sweepstake, which had run since 1930, although their licence bid was unsuccessful. The Irish Hospitals' Sweepstake entered voluntary liquidation in March 1987 when its operators decided it could not compete with the new National Lottery.

The National Lottery licence was awarded to the An Post National Lottery Company, which was 80 percent owned by Ireland's state-owned postal services provider, An Post, and 20 percent by the Minister for Public Expenditure and Reform. The National Lottery licence was initially issued for a ten-year period, but in 1992 the licence term was extended to 31 March 2000. The licence was subsequently extended for another year. An Post National Lottery Company successfully retained the licence in 2001, when it was the only bidder after two other applications were withdrawn.

In 2011, during the country's post-2008 financial crisis, the Irish government included the National Lottery licence on a list of state assets that could be sold to assist the public finances. In April 2012, the government announced that it would sell a 20-year licence to operate the National Lottery, while ensuring that 30 percent of lottery sales would still go to designated good causes. The National Lottery Act 2013 provided for the sale of the licence, established a new independent lottery regulator, and eliminated some restrictions on Internet gambling to encourage online sales. The legislation added the natural environment to the list of good causes eligible to receive National Lottery funding.

On 3 October 2013, the government announced that the winning bidder for the 20-year licence was Premier Lotteries Ireland DAC, a consortium comprising An Post, An Post Pension Funds, and the Ontario Teachers' Pension Plan (owner of the Camelot Group, operators of the UK National Lottery). The amount of the winning bid was €405 million. The government stated that half the money would go towards a new children's hospital while the other half would be used to pay down debt and fund jobs programmes. Premier Lotteries Ireland began operating the National Lottery in November 2014. Staff of the prior operator, An Post National Lottery Company, were transferred to Premier Lotteries Ireland. Dermot Griffin, who had headed the An Post National Lottery Company since 2006, served as chief executive of PLI until he stepped down in 2019. He was succeeded by former Paddy Power executive Andrew Algeo.

The regulator of the National Lottery may serve a term not exceeding seven years, and may be reappointed for one additional term. The first regulator appointed under the National Lottery Act 2013 was Liam Sloyan, a former chief executive of the Health Insurance Authority, who took up the position on 17 November 2014. He was succeeded by Carol Boate, a former director of corporate services in the Competition and Consumer Protection Commission. Her appointment took effect on 9 October 2017.

Administrative and regulatory issues 
In 2015, representatives of PLI appeared before the Oireachtas Finance Committee to explain technological faults affecting the running of the National Lottery. One problem had delayed the midweek Lotto draw scheduled for 4 February 2015 until the following day, the first time a Lotto draw had been postponed.

In 2020, following an investigation, the National Lottery regulator found that PLI had breached three provisions of the National Lottery Act 2013, as well as its licence with the Irish state, by omitting top prizes totaling €180,000 from three scratchcard games, one held in 2015 and two held in 2019. The investigation found that the omissions were due to human error. PLI returned the prizes to consumers through a New Year's Special Draw and also made a €50,000 donation to a mental health charity.

In December 2022, PLI chief executive Andrew Algeo was questioned by the Irish parliament's Public Accounts Committee regarding PLI's use of unclaimed prizes. Members of the committee criticised PLI for allocating 98 percent of €122 million in unclaimed winnings since 2015 to marketing expenses, while allocating only 2 percent towards extra prizes. Although Algeo defended the marketing expenditure as necessary to promote the lottery, Sinn Féin TD Matt Carthy accused PLI of "taking the piss really in terms of what you’re giving towards top-up prizes".

Games
The National Lottery began gaming operations on 23 March 1987 when it launched its first scratchcards, selling an estimated 1 million on the first day of trading. It launched its flagship drawing game Lotto the following year, holding the first draw on 16 April 1988. The National Lottery now offers Lotto and Lotto Plus draws on Wednesdays and Saturdays, EuroMillions and Plus draws on Tuesdays and Fridays, and two Daily Million draws each day. It also runs a range of other games, including televised bingo, Millionaire Raffles, and online instant-win games.

National Lottery tickets and scratchcards are sold by retail agents around the country. As of 31 December 2020, there were 5,415 retailers in the National Lottery's network. Since 2009, the National Lottery has offered the facility to buy lottery tickets and play instant-win games online. In 2020, around 15 percent of the National Lottery's sales were transacted online.

All National Lottery prizes are paid out as tax-free lump sums. All prizes in Lotto, EuroMillions, and Daily Million games must be claimed within 90 days of the applicable drawing dates. The minimum age for playing all National Lottery games is 18, and winners have the right to remain anonymous. All unclaimed prizes are retained by the National Lottery and must be used for promotional expenses. Between 2015 and 2020, €90 million in prizes went unclaimed.

Lotto
Lotto is a six-number lottery game that began with a 6/36 format. The first Lotto draw was held on Saturday, 16 April 1988, with Brigid McGrath from Letterkenny, County Donegal winning the inaugural jackpot of £147,059. Drawings continued weekly on Saturday nights until the National Lottery introduced an additional midweek Lotto draw, first held on Wednesday, 30 May 1990. Since then, Lotto draws have been held twice weekly on Wednesday and Saturdays. Ticket sales close at 7:45 p.m. on those days, and draws are held at 7:55 p.m.

In a 6/36 lottery, the odds of matching all six numbers and winning the jackpot are 1 in 1,947,792. At Lotto's initial cost of £0.50 per line, all combinations could be purchased for £973,896, leaving Lotto vulnerable to a brute force attack. When the jackpot reached £1.7 million for the May 1992 bank holiday drawing, a syndicate organized by Polish-Irish businessman Stefan Klincewicz attempted to purchase all possible combinations and thus win all possible prizes, including a special £100 prize for each Match-4 winner. Although the National Lottery tried to foil the syndicate by limiting the number of tickets any single machine could sell, and turning off terminals its ticket purchasers were using heavily, the syndicate still managed to purchase over 80 percent of the combinations, spending an estimated £820,000 on tickets. It had the winning numbers on the night, but two other players also held winning tickets, and so the syndicate could claim only one-third of the jackpot, or £568,682. Match-5 and Match-4 prizes brought its total winnings to approximately £1,166,000, representing a profit of around £310,000 before expenses.

To prevent another brute force attack, the National Lottery changed Lotto to a 6/39 game for drawings beginning on 22 August 1992, raising the jackpot odds to 1 in 3,262,623. To compensate for the longer odds, the National Lottery doubled the starting jackpot, added a bonus number to the drawings, and awarded new prizes for Match-5+bonus, Match-4+bonus, and Match-3+bonus.

Anticipating competition in border counties from the 6/49 British National Lottery, which began operations on 14 November 1994, the National Lottery changed Lotto to a 6/42 game on 24 September 1994, which made the jackpot odds 1 in 5,245,786. At the same time, it introduced computer-generated "quick picks" as an alternative to marking numbers on paper play slips.

Beginning on 26 September 1998, the National Lottery increased the cost of a line of Lotto from £0.50 to £0.75, doubled the game's starting jackpot to £1 million, and increased most of the game's smaller prizes by 50 percent. After Ireland adopted the euro currency on 1 January 2002, the cost of a line of Lotto became €0.95, and the starting jackpot became €1.269 million (the euro equivalent of £1 million). For draws beginning 1 September 2002, the price of Lotto was rounded to €1 per line, and the starting jackpot was raised slightly to €1.35 million.

In November 2006, after several years of declining sales, the National Lottery changed Lotto to a 6/45 game to produce more rollovers and bigger jackpots. This made the odds of winning the jackpot 1 in 8,145,060. The National Lottery also made the starting jackpot a guaranteed €2 million, increased the Match-5+bonus prize from €12,000 to €25,000, introduced a Match-3 prize of €5, and increased the price of a line of Lotto from €1 to €1.50.

Less than a year after Premier Lotteries Ireland took over the running of the National Lottery, it changed Lotto to a 6/47 game. The change took effect for drawings beginning 3 September 2015, making the odds of winning the jackpot 1 in 10,737,573. It increased the Match-5+bonus prize from €25,000 to what it stated would be an average of over €100,000, and additionally introduced a Match-2+bonus prize of a two-line Daily Million quick pick with Plus. The company also increased the price of Lotto from €1.50 to €2 per line, increasing the minimum cost of a ticket from €3 to €4.

The Lotto jackpot rolls over until won, increasing with each rollover. Under rules introduced in 2015, when the jackpot reaches a new all-time high, it is capped at that level. Once a jackpot is capped, funds that otherwise would have gone toward increasing the jackpot are divided in each draw among ticket-holders in the next-highest prize tier that has at least one winner.

2021–22 Jackpot Rollovers and Will-Be-Won draws 
For a record 63 consecutive Lotto draws from 9 June 2021 to 12 January 2022, no ticket matched all six numbers to win the jackpot, breaking the previous record of 22 consecutive rollovers. The jackpot reached an all-time high of €19,060,800 on 29 September 2021, surpassing the previous record jackpot of €18,963,441 that had been won on 28 June 2008 by a syndicate in Bennekerry, Carlow. The jackpot was capped at this amount for subsequent draws.

In November 2021, after 46 consecutive rollovers, Fine Gael TD Bernard Durkan called for a "full investigation and audit ... in the interests of public confidence." He also called on Premier Lotteries Ireland to return Lotto to a 6/45 game to make the jackpot more winnable. A PLI spokesperson called the sequence of rollovers "unprecedented", noting that since Lotto had become a 6/47 game in September 2015, 80 percent of jackpots had been won within seven weeks. National Lottery regulator Carol Boate and PLI representatives appeared before the government's Joint Committee on Finance, Public Expenditure and Reform on 14 December 2021. Boate stated that there had been no irregularites with Lotto draws, observing that similar extended sequences of rollovers had also been seen in other countries' lotteries. PLI chief executive Andrew Algeo stated that PLI was seeking regulatory approval for a "must-win" draw if a capped jackpot had not been won for an extended period.

In January 2022, the regulator gave approval for a Will-Be-Won draw, under which, if no ticket matched all six winning numbers, the outstanding jackpot would flow down to the winner(s) of the next prize tier. A Will-Be-Won draw was held on Saturday, 15 January 2022. Shops were described as "manic" ahead of the draw due to high demand for tickets, while both the National Lottery's website and app experienced outages due to heavy usage. A family syndicate from County Mayo matched all six numbers to win the €19,060,800 jackpot outright, after buying the winning quick-pick ticket at Laura's XL store in Castlebar. To prevent future capped jackpots from rolling over indefinitely, Lotto game rules were changed to require a Will-Be-Won draw no more than five draws after a jackpot cap has been reached.

Lotto Plus and Lotto Plus Raffle
In 2000, the National Lottery introduced Lotto Plus as an add-on to the main Lotto game. For an extra £0.25 per line, players could enter their Lotto numbers in an additional 6/42 drawing for a fixed, non-rolling jackpot of £250,000. The first Lotto Plus drawing took place on 25 October 2000. In 2002, the National Lottery added a second Lotto Plus drawing, renamed the drawings Lotto Plus 1 and Lotto Plus 2, and raised the cost of Lotto Plus to €0.50 per line. The jackpots were fixed at €300,000 and €200,000 respectively. The first drawings for Lotto Plus 1 and Lotto Plus 2 took place on 1 September 2002.

In November 2006, when Lotto became a 6/45 game, the National Lottery raised the Lotto Plus 1 and Lotto Plus 2 jackpots to €350,000 and €250,000 respectively. In September 2015, when Lotto became a 6/47 game, the National Lottery raised the top prize of Lotto Plus 1 to €500,000. It also introduced Lotto Plus Raffle, adding a four-digit raffle code to each Lotto Plus ticket, and awarding a fixed prize of €300 for all ticket-holders who matched the winning code. It also introduced a Match-2+bonus prize of a two-line Daily Million quick pick in both Lotto Plus 1 and Lotto Plus 2.

On 30 August 2018, the cost of Lotto Plus was doubled to €1 per line, the first price increase in 18 years. The Lotto Plus 1 jackpot was doubled to €1 million while the Lotto Plus 2 jackpot remained at €250,000. The fixed prize for Lotto Plus Raffle was increased from €300 to €500, and the National Lottery introduced a special Lotto Plus Million Euro Raffle draw to be held several times a year, under which an additional €1 million would be evenly divided among all winning Lotto Plus Raffle tickets.

The odds of winning the Lotto Plus jackpots are the same as the odds of winning the main Lotto jackpot. More than 90 percent of Lotto players also enter Lotto Plus. The minimum cost of playing Lotto with Lotto Plus is now €6.

Lotto 5-4-3-2-1
Based around the main Lotto draw, Lotto 5-4-3-2-1 was introduced in February 1997. It allows players to win prizes by correctly matching one, two, three, four, or five of the drawn numbers. The more numbers players try to match, the greater the prize. Players may base their choices either on a six-number game (excluding the bonus number) or on a seven-number game (including the bonus number). The prizes for each possible outcome are fixed and do not depend on sales. The odds of winning the six-number game's top prize of €125,000 are 1 in 255,657. The odds of winning the seven-number game's top prize of €40,000 are 1 in 73,045.

EuroMillions

The National Lottery joined the transnational EuroMillions lottery on 8 October 2004. Since then, several significant EuroMillions jackpots have been won or shared in Ireland. On 31 July 2005, Dolores McNamara, a part-time cleaning lady from Limerick, won a EuroMillions jackpot of €115 million, at the time the largest lottery prize ever won in Europe. On 19 February 2019, a family syndicate from North Dublin won a €175 million jackpot, which holds the record for Ireland's largest ever lottery win. The odds of winning the EuroMillions jackpot are 1 in 139,838,160.

Ireland Only Raffle 
For each EuroMillions line purchased in Ireland, the buyer receives a nine-character Ireland Only Raffle (IOR) code made up of four letters and five numbers. Ten IOR codes are selected on each EuroMillions draw night, with the winners receiving €5,000 each. In August 2021, the National Lottery awarded five IOR codes an extra €1 million each over the course of two weeks.

Plus
In June 2007, the National Lottery introduced "Plus," an add-on to the main EuroMillions game available only to Irish players. For an extra €1 per line, players can enter their five main EuroMillions numbers in an additional draw for a fixed, non-rolling jackpot of €500,000. Players can also win fixed prizes of €2,000 for a Match-4 and €20 for a Match-3. The odds of winning the Plus jackpot are 1 in 2,118,760.

Daily Million
In September 2012, the National Lottery introduced Daily Million to replace both Monday Million (a former draw game with prizes up to €1 million, held once weekly on Monday nights) and All or Nothing (a former daily draw game with prizes up to €500,000). A 6/39 lottery drawing with a fixed, non-rolling jackpot of €1 million, Daily Million takes place twice every day, including weekends and bank holidays. It costs €1 per line to play. For an extra €0.50 per line, players can play Daily Million Plus for a top prize of €500,000. Draws take place at 2 p.m. and 9 p.m. each day at the National Lottery Headquarters under the supervision of independent observers and National Lottery personnel. The odds of winning the Daily Million and Daily Million Plus jackpots are 1 in 3,262,623.

Millionaire Raffle
In the summer of 2008, the National Lottery ran its first Millionaire Raffle. Since then, limited-edition Millionaire Raffles have been held to coincide with special occasions such as Christmas and Easter. For the Christmas 2022 Millionaire Raffle, 500,000 tickets were sold at a cost of €25 each. The top prize was €1 million, with an additional five prizes of €100,000, 12 prizes of €10,000, 35 prizes of €5,000, 265 prizes of €1,000, and 6,300 prizes of €500.

Telly Bingo
The National Lottery introduced Telly Bingo in September 1999. Players buy tickets with 24 randomly generated numbers, and can win prizes by matching the numbers drawn on a lunchtime TV show in a variety of patterns, with a prize of €10,000 for a full house. An additional €10,000 Snowball prize goes to someone who achieves a full house on or before the 45th number drawn. If not won, the Snowball prize rolls over to the next draw, allowing one additional number each time. Telly Bingo takes place three times a week, on Tuesdays, Thursdays and Fridays, with the Telly Bingo TV Gameshow broadcast on RTÉ One at 12.45 p.m.

Scratchcards and Instant Win Games
The National Lottery offered 23 scratchcard games during 2019, ranging in price from €1 to €10, and offering prizes from €2 to €100,000. It also offered a number of online instant-win games, with prizes up to €350,000.

Game shows
The National Lottery has funded the prize money for televised game shows. Players who get three "lucky stars" on associated scratchcards can submit them for televised drawings, with the winners appearing as contestants on the game show. The National Lottery's flagship game show Winning Streak was broadcast on Saturday nights on RTÉ One between 1990 and 2020. Winning Streak was suspended in March 2020 due to the COVID-19 pandemic, and is not projected to resume until late 2023. Other televised game shows associated with the National Lottery have included Fame & Fortune, The Trump Card, The Big Money Game, and The Million Euro Challenge.

References in other media
In the 1990s, RTÉ produced a sitcom called Upwardly Mobile about a working-class family who won the Lotto and moved to an upper-middle-class area. It ran for three seasons between 1995 and 1997.

Waking Ned (known as Waking Ned Devine in North America) is a comedy film set in a tiny rural village, based on a fictitious winner of the Lotto.

References

External links
National Lottery website
Irish Lottery Results
Irish Lottery Results

1987 establishments in Ireland
Economy of the Republic of Ireland
Lotteries
Gambling in Ireland
State-sponsored bodies of the Republic of Ireland